Spirit of Music, also known as The Spirit of Music and the Theodore Thomas Memorial, is an outdoor 1923 sculpture and monument commemorating Theodore Thomas (founder of the Chicago Symphony Orchestra) by Czech-American artist and educator Albin Polasek, installed in Chicago's Grant Park, in the U.S. state of Illinois.

See also
 1923 in art
 List of public art in Chicago

References

External links
 

1923 establishments in Illinois
1923 sculptures
Monuments and memorials in Chicago
Musical instruments in art
Nude sculptures in the United States
Outdoor sculptures in Chicago
Sculptures of women in Illinois
Statues in Chicago